Hymenocallis choctawensis  is a plant in the family Amaryllidaceae, with the common names Choctaw spiderlily and Florida panhandle spider-lily. It grows along streambanks and in swamp forests of western Florida, eastern Louisiana, and southern parts of Alabama, Georgia and Mississippi.

The species is often misidentified as H. caroliniana or H. occidentalis. It can be distinguished from those species by its rhizomatous bulb and triangular bracts.

References

choctawensis
Flora of the Southeastern United States
Plants described in 1962
Flora without expected TNC conservation status